Battle of Guam may refer to:

 The Battle of Guam (1941), a World War II battle in which Japanese forces took the island from the Americans in December 1941
 The Battle of Guam (1944), a World War II battle in which two American divisions fought for a month to retake the island from the Japanese

See also
 Capture of Guam, a bloodless event in which American forces took the island from Spain in 1898